Eutelia approximata (sometimes assigned to the genus Atacira) is a moth of the family Noctuidae first described by Francis Walker in 1863. It is found in Sri Lanka and Sundaland.

Forewings purplish gray. Postmedial and submarginal lines are thin, pale and irregular. Medial and antemedial lines are angled and dark brown.

References

Moths of Asia
Moths described in 1963
Euteliinae